The IFFI Award for Best Debut Director (officially known as the Silver Peacock for the Best Debut Film of a Director) is an honor presented annually at the International Film Festival of India since the 47th IFFI 2016 for the best debut film direction in World cinema.

Recipients

IFFI Best Debut Director Award (2016–Present)

References

International Film Festival of India
Lists of Indian award winners
Awards for best director
Indian film awards